Kathanam is a 2019 Indian Telugu-language action thriller film directed by Rajesh Nadendla while screenplay was penned by Rajendra Bharadwaj. The film stars Anasuya Bharadwaj, Vennela Kishore and Srinivas Avasarala in the lead roles. The film is produced under the production banner Gayathri Films. Music for the film was composed by Roshan Salur, and the cinematography was handled by Sathish Muthyala. The film was released on 9 August 2019 and opened to negative reviews from critics.

Plot 
Anu, an inspiring director, is given an opportunity to pen a script for a film. As she pens her script, the characters in the script start to die in real life. Anu approaches ACP Randhir to prevent further deaths.

Cast 

 Anasuya Bharadwaj as Anu
 Dhanraj as Dhana
 Randhir Gatla as ACP Randhir
 Vennela Kishore as CK alias Creative Kishore
 Srinivas Avasarala
 Babloo Prithiveeraj
 Sameer as DCP Prakash
 Sampoornesh Babu as himself cameo appearance

Soundtrack

Marketing 
The first look poster of the film was unveiled in October 2018 by the lead actress. The official trailer of the film was released on 3 August 2019.

References

External links 

 
 Kathanam at Amazon

2019 films
2010s Telugu-language films
2019 action thriller films
2010s mystery thriller films
Indian action thriller films
Indian mystery thriller films
Films about dreams